The Vampire's Trail is a 1914 American silent drama film directed by T. Hayes Hunter and Robert G. Vignola and written by Benjamin Barondess, T. Hayes Hunter, Michael Potter and Robert G. Vignola.

The film stars Alice Joyce, Tom Moore, Alice Hollister, Harry F. Millarde and Robert Walker.

Plot 
A young mother wants to be with her child so much that she is cross to her husband when he asks her to spend a pleasant evening with him away from home. The husband in consequence seeking diversion and relief from business cares alone, drifts away from her.

Cast 

 Alice Joyce as Laura Payne - Horace's Wife
 Tom Moore as Horace Payne - a Wealthy Broker
 Alice Hollister as Rita Caselli - a Cabaret Singer
 Harry F. Millarde as Phil Olcott - Horace's Friend (as Harry Millarde)
 Robert Walker as John Dugan - a Reporter

References

External links 
 

1914 films
Silent American drama films
American black-and-white films
American silent short films
1910s English-language films
1910s American films